The National Rugby League's Good Friday Game is held annually on the Good Friday holiday in Australia between the South Sydney Rabbitohs and Canterbury-Bankstown Bulldogs. It is traditionally played at Stadium Australia.

In 2014, it took a Trent Hodkinson field goal in the 78th minute to gift the Canterbury-Bankstown Bulldogs the win 15-14. In 2015, a controversial finish to the match ended with a penalty being awarded against James Graham of Canterbury-Bankstown, allowing South Sydney to score a winning penalty goal. 

This led to arguments between Canterbury players and referee Gerard Sutton, with David Klemmer being sin binned for dissent. Canterbury-Bankstown supporters then threw objects at the referees as they were escorted swiftly of the field straight after full-time. In 2020, due to the COVID-19 pandemic in Australia, the NRL season was postponed meaning the match did not go ahead.

In round 4 of the 2021 NRL season, South Sydney recorded the biggest win in the fixture defeating Canterbury-Bankstown 38-0.

Head to head

Results

References 

Canterbury-Bankstown Bulldogs
South Sydney Rabbitohs
Rugby league rivalries
Recurring sporting events established in 2012
2012 establishments in Australia
Sports rivalries in Australia
National Rugby League
Rugby league competitions in Australia
Rugby league in Sydney
Easter traditions
Holy Week